Jean Newton McIlwraith (December 28, 1858 – November 17, 1938) was a Canadian novelist and biographer. Her works include children's books, 1 opera, and historical romances, such as The Curious Career of Roderick Campbell (1901), A Diana of Quebec (1912), and Kinsmen at War (1927).

Biography
McIlwraith was born in 1858 in Hamilton, Ontario. Her parents were Mary Park and Thomas McIlwraith, a noted ornithologist. She attended the Wesleyan Ladies College and studied modern literature through a correspondence program with Queen Margaret College of the University of Glasgow. From 1902 to 1919 she worked in New York City for publishing companies and achieved the position of head reader at Doubleday, Page and Co. In 1919 she returned to Canada to devote her time to writing. She suffered from arteriosclerosis and died from pneumonia in Burlington, Ontario in 1938.

Works
McIlwraith published one opera and several books in the genre of romance and historical fiction. She also published numerous short stories which appeared in magazines such as Harper's, Atlantic Monthly and Cornhill Magazine.

 Ptarmigan, 1895 (comic opera, co-authored with John Aldous)
 The Making of Mary, 1895 (pseud. Jean Forsyth)
 The Span o' Life: a Tale of Louisburg and Quebec, 1899
 Canada, 1900
 The Curious Case or Roderick Campbell, 1901
 Kinsmen at War, 1927

References

Further reading
 Barber, Marilyn. "The Women Ontario welcomed: Immigrant Domestics for Ontario Homes, 1870-1930," Ontario History 72 (Sept. 1980): 148-172.
 Wilson, Elizabeth. "Beloved Friend," Saturday Night, 17 Dec. 1938: 28.

External links
 
 

1858 births
1938 deaths
Canadian historical novelists
Canadian women novelists
19th-century Canadian novelists
20th-century Canadian novelists
19th-century Canadian women writers
20th-century Canadian women writers